Maciej Cieślak (born 9 September 1969 in Gdańsk) is a Polish guitarist and songwriter, best known as the vocalist and guitarist of the alternative rock band Ścianka, which he founded in November 1994 in Sopot. Cieślak is also a member of Kings of Caramel music band.

References

1969 births
Living people
Musicians from Gdańsk
Polish male singers